Desmethylmoramide (INN) is an opioid analgesic related to dextromoramide (the active (+)-isomer of moramide) that was synthesized and characterized in the late 1950s but was never marketed.

See also 
 Dipyanone
 Nufenoxole
 Phenadoxone

References

Further reading 

 

4-Morpholinyl compunds
Opioids